Jörg Michael (born 27 March 1963) is a German drummer who is known for playing with numerous groups, including the power metal band Stratovarius, with whom he played from 1995 to 2011. He has also been a member of Mekong Delta, Rage, and many more heavy metal bands.

Biography 
Michael left Stratovarius in 2011 for "personal reasons". Around the same time he was diagnosed with thyroid cancer, from which he later made a full recovery.

He is currently a member of Heavatar, a German power metal band founded in 2013.

Michael is considered to be one of the most important and influential power metal drummers.

Discography 
Avenger
Prayers of Steel (1985)
Depraved to Black (EP, 1985)

Rage
Reign of Fear (1986)
Execution Guaranteed (1987)
10 Years in Rage (1994)

Der Riss
They All Do What Their Image Says (EP, 1986)

100 Names
100 Names (1986)

The Raymen
Going Down to Death Valley (1986)
The Rebel Years (best-of) (1995)

Metal Sword
Metal Sword (1986)

Mekong Delta
Mekong Delta (1986)
The Music of Erich Zann (1988)
Toccata (1989)
The Principle of Doubt (1989)
Dances of Death (and Other Walking Shadows) (1990)
Classics (1993)

X-Mas Project
X-Mas Project (1986)

Tom Angelripper
Ein Schöner Tag (1995)

Axel Rudi Pell
Wild Obsession (1989)
Nasty Reputation (1991)
Eternal Prisoner (1992)
The Ballads (1993)
Between the Walls (1994)
Black Moon Pyramid (1996)
Magic (1997)
Oceans of Time (1998)
The Ballads II (1999)

Laos
Laos (1989)
We Want It (EP, 1990)
More than a Feeling (EP, 1993)
Come Tomorrow (EP, 1993)

Headhunter
Parody of Life (1990)
A Bizarre Gardening Accident (1993)
Rebirth (1994)
Parasite Of Society (2008)

Schwarzarbeit
Third Album' (1990)

 Grave DiggerThe Reaper (1993)Symphony of Death (EP, 1994)

Running WildBlack Hand Inn (1994)Masquerade (1995)The Rivalry (1998)

GlenmoreFor the Sake of Truth (1994)

House of SpiritsTurn of the Tide (1994)Psychosphere (1999)

Unleashed PowerMindfailure (1997)Absorbed (EP, 1999)

Andreas ButlerAchterbahn Fahrn (1995)

StratovariusEpisode (1996)Visions (1997)Live! Visions of Europe (1998)Destiny (1998)The Chosen Ones (1999)Infinite (2000)Intermission (2001)Elements Pt. 1 (2002)Elements Pt. 2 (2003)Stratovarius (2005)Black Diamond: The Anthology (2006)Polaris (2009)Elysium (2011)Enigma: Intermission 2 (2018)

Avec AvalonMystic Places (1997)

Die HerzensbrecherSeid Glücklich Und Mehret Euch (1998)

Andy & The TraceelordsPussy! (1998)

Beto Vázquez InfinityBeto Vázquez Infinity (2001)

SaxonLionheart (2004)

KaledonChapter 3: The Way of the light (2005)

Devil's TrainDevil's Train (2012)Devil's Train 2 (2015)

HeavatarAll My Kingdoms (2013)The Annihilation'' (2018)

References

External links

Living people
1963 births
German heavy metal drummers
Male drummers
German male musicians
Stratovarius members
Rage (German band) members
Mekong Delta (band) members
Musicians from Dortmund